The Magnum Light Phaser is a light gun created in 1987 for the ZX Spectrum computer. A version was also released for the Commodore 64/128. It was Amstrad's last peripheral for the video game console. The Magnum Light Phaser in many ways resembles the Light Phaser, the Sega Master System light gun, released in 1986. It was a Sinclair-branded Far Eastern product which was included in promotional bundles such as the "James Bond 007 Action Pack", along with a small number of lightgun-compatible games.

It was also available separately in a £29.95 pack along with six games. Only a few games bothered with lightgun compatibility (Operation Wolf, the original arcade gun game, was the most notable) and fewer still were produced specifically for use with the Magnum. Even so, the lightgun was widely available, largely because Amstrad's bundling policy ensured wide distribution.

Software Creations created five exclusive games for the Commodore 64 package.

Supported Games

Spectrum:

Bullseye
James Bond 007
Missile: Ground Zero
Operation Wolf
Robot Attack
Rookie
Solar Invasion

Bundled with the Commodore 64 version:
Baby Blues
Cosmic Storm
Ghost Town
Goosebusters
Gunslinger
Operation Wolf (replaces the NEOS mouse control option)

Bundled with the Commodore 64 Lightgun package, and compatible with the Magnum:
Army Days
Gangster
Time Traveller
Blaze-Out (compilation of Ocean game sequences with lightgun controls)

References

External links
Crash review of the Magnum Light Gun and Games
Light Phaser

Light guns
ZX Spectrum
Commodore 64
Game controllers
Amstrad